Valluga is a  high mountain in the Lechtal Alps. The border between the Austrian states Tyrol and Vorarlberg runs over the summit. It is about 3 km north of the village St. Christoph am Arlberg and the Arlberg Pass.

Vallugabahn 

The summit of Valluga is accessible by an aerial tramway called Vallugabahn. This consists of two parts:
 Vallugabahn 1 has its valley station at 2091 m and its upper station at 2648 m.
 Vallugabahn 2 has its lower station at 2642 m and its top station at 2811 m.

Other infrastructures 

In summer 2006 a C-band weather radar operated by Austro Control was installed on top of Valluga.

Valluga hosts some amateur radio infrastructures: a 2-meter band amateur radio repeater (uplink 145.6875 MHz, Downlink 145.0875 MHz) and a packet radio digipeater. Both have a common callsign OE7XVR. Between 2004 and 2010 there was also an amateur television repeater (callsign OE7XSI) with interlinks other repeaters in Austria, Switzerland and Germany.

Ascents 
Ascents from alpine club huts:
 From Ulmer Hütte (2285 m) in two hours.
 From Stuttgarter Hütte (2310 m) in two and a half hours.

Ascents from settlements:
 From Zürs (1717 m) in four hours.

References 

Mountains of the Alps
Mountains of Tyrol (state)
Mountains of Vorarlberg